Cracking the Coding Interview: 189 Programming Questions and Solutions is a book by Gayle Laakmann McDowell about coding interviews. It describes typical problems in computer science that are often asked during coding interviews, typically on a whiteboard during job interviews at big technology companies such as  Google, Apple, Microsoft, Amazon.com, Facebook and Palantir Technologies.

First published in 2008, it has been translated into seven languages: Russian, Simplified Chinese, Traditional Chinese, Japanese, Polish, Spanish, and Korean. It describes solutions to common problems set in coding job interviews. The sixth edition of the textbook was published in 2015.

The book has been cited in peer reviewed papers in scientific journals such as PeerJ.

References 

2008 non-fiction books
Books about computer and internet companies
Job interview